Potter-Van Camp House is a historic home located at Bath in Steuben County, New York.  It was built about 1845–1850 and is a -story, Gothic Revival–style frame cottage.

It was listed on the National Register of Historic Places in 1983.

References

Houses on the National Register of Historic Places in New York (state)
Gothic Revival architecture in New York (state)
Houses completed in 1850
Houses in Steuben County, New York
National Register of Historic Places in Steuben County, New York